The Devastator may refer to:

Devastator Peak, a mountain in southwestern British Columbia, Canada
The Devastator Assemblage, a rock unit forming the Mount Meager massif in southwestern British Columbia, Canada
 The Devastator, Darth Vader's flagship Star Destroyer